Jeon In-kwon (born September 4, 1954) is a South Korean singer-songwriter and former lead singer of the band Deulgukhwa, who were known as the "Beatles of Korea."

Career 
Jeon debuted as the lead singer of the folk rock band Apart and Together (따로 또 같이). In 1979, they released their first album, Face That Hang (맴도는 얼굴). However, Jeon was unhappy with the album and later said of it, "I thought I would sneak into the recording studio and set a fire to get rid of the master tape."

In 1985, he formed the rock band Deulgukhwa (들국화), and they released their first album, March (행진). The group became immensely popular among young people for its rebellious messages in the era of South Korean military rule. In 2007, a group of music critics ranked the group's first album No. 1 on a list of the "100 Greatest Music Albums of Korea."

Jeon sang John Lennon's "Imagine" at the 2018 Winter Olympics opening ceremony in Pyeongchang, alongside singers Ha Hyun-woo, Lee Eun-mi, and Ahn Ji-young.

Discography

Apart and Together

Deulgukhwa

As a solo artist

References

1954 births
Living people
20th-century South Korean male singers
South Korean folk rock singers
South Korean record producers
South Korean guitarists
Musicians from Seoul
21st-century South Korean male singers
South Korean male singer-songwriters